Sustain is a 2018 composition for orchestra by the American composer Andrew Norman. The work was premiered on October 4, 2018 by the Los Angeles Philharmonic, conducted by Gustavo Dudamel, as part of their centennial season.

Composition

Inspiration 
Sustain was commissioned by the Los Angeles Philharmonic for their centennial season. Norman has stated that he began by imagining what orchestral music will mean in the future, during the 200th season of the orchestra. Thus, the piece was conceptualized as "one long unbroken musical thought", focusing on the importance of communal listening. However, it eventually came to represent the Earth and the vast scale of geologic time.

Norman has explained in an interview that the title "Sustain" comes partly from his background as a pianist (in reference to the sustain pedal), and that it also relates to the idea that each note in the piece should have its own journey.

Structure 
Sustain's form has been described by Norman as a "contracting spiral". It consists of ten cycles of the same music, becoming faster each time they repeat. Each cycle begins with a distinctive "signal" played by two pianos (tuned a quarter tone apart), followed by waves of sound in the strings. As the winds begin to interrupt, the music becomes more hectic and climactic, after which it fades and the cycle ends. The first cycle lasts approximately seventeen minutes, while the final spans mere seconds. Eventually, the orchestra is left in an unconducted, semi-improvisational section that slowly dies out, leaving the two pianos. The piece concludes with the pianos' signal, after which the strings mime (but do not play) a sustained note on their highest string.

A similar structure was used in Norman's earlier and shorter work Spiral. In describing that work, Norman said that he had been considering the idea of a "spiral-shaped" orchestral piece for some time.

Instrumentation
The piece is scored for the following orchestra:

Woodwinds
3 Flutes (3rd doubling piccolo)
3 Oboes
3 Clarinets
3 Bassoons

Brass
4 Horns
4 Trumpets
3 Trombones
1 Tuba

Percussion (4 players)
Timpani
Bass drum
Bell tree
Crotales
Glockenspiel
4 Log drums
2 Suspended pieces of plywood
Tam-tam
4 Temple blocks
Vibraphone
2 Pianos (one detuned by a quarter tone)

Strings
Harp
16 Violin I
14 Violin II
12 Violas
10 Cellos
8 Double basses

Reception and awards
The piece has been described as "sublime" by The New York Times, and as a "masterpiece" by both the Los Angeles Times and The New Yorker.

In 2020, Norman was nominated for the Grammy Award for Best Contemporary Classical Composition for the work, and the Los Angeles Philharmonic won the Grammy Award for Best Orchestral Performance for their 2019 recording of the piece. The composition was also a finalist for the 2019 Pulitzer Prize for Music.

See also
2018 in music
Contemporary classical music

References

External links
Audio only video on YouTube

Compositions by Andrew Norman
Contemporary classical compositions
2018 compositions
Culture and the environment
Music commissioned by the Los Angeles Philharmonic